An orthocone is an unusually long straight shell of a nautiloid cephalopod. During the 18th and 19th centuries, all shells of this type were named Orthoceras, creating a wastebasket taxon, but it is now known that many groups of nautiloids developed or retained this type of shell.

An orthocone can be thought of as like a nautilus, but with the shell straight and uncoiled. It was previously believed that these represented the most primitive form of nautiloid, but it is now known that the earliest nautiloids had shells that were slightly curved.  An orthoconic form evolved several times among cephalopods, and among nautiloid cephalopods is prevalent among the ellesmerocerids, endocerids, actinocerids, orthoceratoids, and bactritids.

Orthocones existed from the Late Cambrian to the Late Triassic, but they were most common in the early Paleozoic. Revivals of the orthocone design later occurred in other cephalopod groups, notably baculitid ammonites in the Cretaceous Period. Orthocone cephalopod fossils are known from all over the world, with particularly significant finds in Ontario, Canada, and Morocco.

References 

Cephalopod zootomy